The Chthonioidea are a superfamily of pseudoscorpions, representing the earliest diverging and most primitive living pseudoscorpions. The superfamily contains two families.
Pseudotyrannochthoniidae — worldwide (c. 5 genera, 50 species)
Chthoniidae  — worldwide ( 40 + genera, 600+ species)

Some authors consider the genus Lechytia to be in its own family Lechytiidae, rather than to reside in Chthoniidae.

Footnotes

 
Arachnid superfamilies